Lake Wivenhoe is the name both a lake formed by the Wivenhoe Dam and the locality which contains it in the Somerset Region, Queensland, Australia.

Geography
The locality includes the dam wall and associated water management infrastructure at the south, the lake created by the dam, sections of Brisbane River and Stanley River as they flow into the lake from the north and a narrow strip of land around the dam, the lake and river the sections. The lake's boundaries are very irregular and this is reflected in the very irregular boundaries of the locality. The locality is entirely set aside for water management purposes.

Due to its unusual shape, Lake Wivenhoe has many adjacent localities including (commencing from the dam wall in the south and proceeding clockwise:
Wivenhoe Pocket, Patrick Estate, Wivenhoe Hill, Coominya, Moombra, Glen Esk, Murrumba, Coal Creek, Caboonbah, Mount Beppo, Cressbrook, Lower Cressbrook, Cooeeimbardi, Somerset Dam, Crossdale, Bryden, Dundas, and Split Yard Creek.

The Brisbane Valley Highway passes through the south of the locality as it travels across the top of the dam wall.

The formation of the lake created numerous headlands, inlets, bays and islands.

Headlands 
Headlands into the lake include:

 Bauer Point

 Brough Point
 Conroys Point
 Crowe Point
 Harris Point
 Lees Point
 Loganview Point
 Mclean Point
 Monreid Point
 O'Briens Point
 Pakleppa Point
 Robenlea Point
 Rockville Point
 Sinnamon Point
 Wheelers Point
 Whitfield Point

Inlets and bays 
Inlets and bays in the lake include:
 Apel Inlet
 Bellevue Bay
 Billies Bay )
 Burrundon Bay
 Coal Inlet
 Conroys Cove
 Cormorant Bay
 Davis Bay
 Five Mile Water
 Logan Inlet
 McGraths Bay
 Middle Inlet
 Moioo Bay
 Moombra Bay
 Northbrook Inlet
 Paddys Inlet
 Sheep Station Inlet
 Tea Tree Inlet
 Tulungra Inlet
 Varleys Cove

Islands 
There is one island in the lake itself:

 Murrumba Island, a  island
and two others in the Brisbane River leading into the lake:
 Marshall Island, a  island
 Stanley Island, a  island

History 
The name Wivenhoe comes from the name of the pastoral property established circa 1845 by Edmund Blucher Uhr, which took its name from the town of Wivenhoe in Essex, England.

The heritage-listed Caboonbah Homestead was located on to the north-west of the lake (near but not within the locality of Caboonbah) where it was a tourist attraction operated by the Brisbane Valley Historical Society until the homestead burned down in 2009.

In the  Lake Wivenhoe had a population of 3 people.

Heritage listings

Lake Wivenhoe has a number of heritage-listed sites, including:
 Esk-Kilcoy Road: Caboonbah Homestead

Transport 
There are three main roads in the area. The Brisbane Valley Highway comes to the lake from the south and then travels along the western side of the lake towards Esk. Wivenhoe Somerset Road separates from the highway at the south of the lake and travels along the eastern side of the dam towards Somerset Dam. Due to the irregular shape of the boundaries of the locality around the lake, both roads weave through the locality and the adjacent localities on each side of the lake. Northbank Parkway comes from Mount Glorious to the east and terminates on the east of the lake at Wivenhoe Somerset Road.

Northbrook Parkway heliport is at the junction of Wivenhoe Somerset Road and Northbank Parkway.

Attractions and amenities
Although it is not a populated area, Lake Wivenhoe offers a range of outdoor recreational facilities for camping, picnics, swimming, fishing and water sports. A stocked impoundment permit is required to fish in the dam. Swimming is permitted and camp sites have been established. Electric and non-powered boating with a permit is allowed, but domestic animals are banned.

West of the lake 
Cormorant Bay Recreation Area has picnic and barbeque facilities and a children's playground. It is suitable for walking and fishing. It is off the Brisbane Valley Highway.

Wivenhoe Dam Spillway has a lookout over the dam spillway. It has picnic and barbeque facilities. It is off the Brisbane Valley Highway.

Lake Wivenhoe Information Centre provides information about the dam and the lake. It is off the Brisbane Valley Highway.

Wivenhoe Hill Trails are for walking, cycling and horse riding. They are off Fig Tree Road.

Logan Complex has three separate areas, one for day use and two for camping: Captain Logan camp ground and the Lumley Hill camp ground. There are picnic and barbeque facilities and a children's playground. This area is suitable for swimming, fishing, canoeing and water sports. Logan Complex is on Logan Inlet Road on the western side of the lake. It has a boat ramp.

Hamon Cove Recreation Area has picnic and barbeque facilities and is suitable for fishing, canoeing and water sports. It is on the western side of the lake off the Brisbane Valley Highway. It has a boat ramp.

East of the lake 
Billies Bay Recreation Area has picnic and barbeque facilities. This area is suitable for swimming, fishing, canoeing and water sports. It is off Bryden Road. It has a boat ramp.

Hays Landing Recreation Area has picnic and barbeque facilities. This area is suitable for fishing, canoeing and water sports. It is off Bryden Road. It has a boat ramp.

North of the lake 
O'Shea's Crossing Rest Area has picnic and barbeque facilities and is suitable for fishing and canoeing. It is on the corner of Esk Kilcoy Road and Cooeeimbardi Road.

References

Suburbs of Somerset Region
Wivenhoe
Localities in Queensland